Auma-Weidatal is a town in the district of Greiz, in Thuringia, Germany. It was named after the town Auma and the river Weida, that flows through the municipality. It was formed on 1 December 2011 by the merger of the former municipalities Auma, Braunsdorf, Göhren-Döhlen, Staitz and Wiebelsdorf. Since January 1996, these and three other municipalities had cooperated in the Verwaltungsgemeinschaft ("collective municipality") Auma-Weidatal. This Verwaltungsgemeinschaft was disbanded on 1 December 2011.  The seat of the municipality and of the former Verwaltungsgemeinschaft is in Auma.

References

Greiz (district)